Arthur Laird Smith (June 21, 1906 – November 22, 1995) was a Major League Baseball pitcher who played for the Chicago White Sox in .

External links

1906 births
1995 deaths
Chicago White Sox players
Major League Baseball pitchers
Baseball players from Massachusetts